Mark Patrick Mitchell (born 22 May 1968) is a New Zealand politician, former mercenary,  and a member of the New Zealand House of Representatives. He is a member of the National Party.

Early life and career
Mitchell was born on Auckland's North Shore and lived his early years at Whenuapai air base, where his father was a flight lieutenant flying Orion aircraft and his mother's father, Air Commodore Frank Gill, was the base commander. Gill was later a National Party cabinet minister, between 1975 and 1980. Mitchell attended Rosmini College, a Catholic school.

He was in the New Zealand Police for thirteen years from 1989 to 2002, including time as a dog handler and in the Armed Offenders Squad. After leaving the police, Mitchell undertook an executive education short course at Wharton Business School.

Mitchell went to Iraq in 2003 to work for British kidnap and ransom risk-management company Control Risks, providing security to officials of the Coalition Provisional Authority government. He and his men were besieged in the Italian-run An Nasiriyah compound in southern Iraq by the Mahdi militia for five days in 2004. He spent a period training Iraqi security forces in 2004, before leaving Iraq. He has refused to confirm whether he killed anyone in conflict, instead saying there were "casualties on both sides".

He then spent six years based in Kuwait. He went to work for Kuwait firm Agility Logistics, which was supplying food to military forces in Iraq. The company set up subsidiary Threat Management Group, with Mitchell as CEO and shareholder, to improve security for its logistics staff. The company took on contracts protecting infrastructure and Mitchell dealt with kidnap and ransom negotiations in Iraq, Afghanistan, Somalia and Darfur. He sold Threat Management Group in 2010, when it had an annual turnover of $130 million, and the sale made him wealthy.

Member of Parliament

Fifth National Government, 2011–2017
When National MP for Rodney and Speaker of the New Zealand House of Representatives Lockwood Smith decided to contest the 2011 New Zealand general election as a list only candidate, Mitchell was a candidate to replace him in Rodney and officially won the National Party pre-selection contest for the seat on 26 April 2011. Mitchell won the seat with over 53% of the vote, defeating his nearest rival, Conservative Party founder and leader Colin Craig by over 12,000 votes.

Mitchell voted against the Marriage (Definition of Marriage) Amendment Bill, a bill allowing same-sex couples to marry in New Zealand.

In 2014, Nicky Hager's book Dirty Politics presented evidence that suggested that Mitchell had hired political strategist Simon Lusk during the National Party selection process for the Rodney electorate. Lusk appeared to have collaborated with blogger Cameron Slater to discredit Mitchell's opponents, particularly Brent Robinson. Mitchell strongly denies ever paying Lusk or Slater.

He served as Chairperson of the Foreign Affairs, Defence and Trade Committee from the 2014 general election. When John Key resigned as Prime Minister and Bill English replaced him in 2016, Mitchell was appointed as Minister for Land Information and Minister of Statistics outside of cabinet by the new Prime Minister. When English reshuffled his cabinet in 2017, Mitchell was considered one of the "big winners" in the reshuffle, being promoted into cabinet and being made Minister of Defence, replacing Gerry Brownlee who was moved into the role of Minister of Foreign Affairs. In the reshuffle Mitchell kept the Land Information portfolio while being replaced in the Statistics portfolio by Scott Simpson.

Coalition Government, 2017–present
During the 2017 general election, Mark Mitchell was re-elected in the Rodney electorate, defeating Labour candidate Marja Lubeck by a margin of 19,561 votes. Following the formation of a Labour-led coalition government, Mitchell was appointed as National's Spokesperson for the defence, disarmament, and justice portfolios. On 22 January 2019, he was designated as National's Spokesperson for Pike River Re-entry.

Following the resignation of short-lived National party leader Todd Muller on 14 July 2020, Mitchell ran against fellow MP Judith Collins for the position of Leader of the National Party. Ultimately, he lost the election for the position as he was not able to get the required 29 members of the National caucus to back him despite backing from former National leader Simon Bridges.

During the 2020 New Zealand general election, Mitchell won the seat of Whangaparāoa (which had replaced his previous electorate of Rodney) by a final margin of 7,823 votes. Following the election, Mitchell ruled out challenging party leader Collins in the wake of National's landslide defeat.

In August 2021 the NZ Herald reported that Mitchell was understood to be firming up a bid for Mayor of Auckland in 2022. In October 2021, however, he announced that he had decided not to stand.

Personal life
Mitchell has two biological children and three step-children. In 2011, he married Peggy Bourne, the widow of rally driver Possum Bourne. They separated and as of 2021, Mitchell is in a new relationship.

References

External links 
Mark Mitchell MP official website
Profile on National party website
Profile on the New Zealand Parliament website

Living people
New Zealand National Party MPs
Members of the New Zealand House of Representatives
New Zealand police officers
Wharton School of the University of Pennsylvania alumni
People educated at Rosmini College
1968 births
New Zealand MPs for Auckland electorates
21st-century New Zealand politicians
Candidates in the 2017 New Zealand general election
New Zealand defence ministers